Olen Lavelle Burrage (March 16, 1930 – March 15, 2013) was a Mississippi farmer and businessman. He was alleged to have been linked to the murders of Chaney, Goodman, and Schwerner who were murdered by the Ku Klux Klan in June 1964. The bodies of the Civil Rights workers were found buried in an earthen dam that was under construction on a farm owned by Burrage.

Background

Burrage was born in Neshoba County, Mississippi, on March 16, 1930. He served in the United States Marine Corps as a truck mechanic during the 1950s. He was honorably discharged and later started Burrage Trucking, Inc. In 1956 Burrage bought a farm in Neshoba County. By 1964 Burrage had acquired several additional tracts of land where he grew corn and raised cattle.  Burrage sold his trucking business in 1990 and dabbled in cattle farming and timberland resources for the remainder of his life. He was a Shriner, Mason, and a deacon at a Baptist church.

Burrage lived most of his life in Mississippi except when he briefly lived in Houston, Texas, working as a bus driver.

Freedom Summer Murders

In the afternoon of June 21, 1964, James Chaney, Andrew Goodman, & Michael Schwerner arrived at Longdale to inspect the burned out church in Neshoba County. They left Longdale around 3 p.m. They were to be in Meridian by 4 p.m. that day. The fastest route to Meridian was through Philadelphia. At the fork of Beacon & Main Street, their station wagon sustained a flat tire. It is possible that a shot was fired at the station wagon's tire. Rainey's home was near the Beacon & Main Street fork. Deputy Cecil Price soon arrived and escorted them to the county jail. Price released the trio as soon as the longest day of the year became night which was about 10 p.m. The three were last seen heading south along Highway 19 toward Meridian.

The disappearance of the three men was initially investigated as a missing persons case. The civil rights workers' burnt-out car was found near a swamp three days after their disappearance. An extensive search of the area was conducted by the Federal Bureau of Investigation (FBI), local and state authorities, and four hundred United States Navy sailors. The three men's bodies were not discovered until two months later, when the team received a tip that led them to  Burrage's farm. During the investigation it emerged that members of the local White Knights of the Ku Klux Klan, the Neshoba County Sheriff's Office, and the Philadelphia Police Department were involved in the incident.

Burrage's Dam

In 1964 Burrage was developing a cattle farm, named the Old Jolly Farm, on Highway 21 which was a few miles southwest of Philadelphia. Burrage hired Herman Tucker to build a dam to create a pond. Tucker was a part-time truck driver for Burrage, and owned two Caterpillar bulldozers.

Sometime before the murders, Burrage remarked about the "invasion" of Civil Rights workers coming to Mississippi. Burrage allegedly proclaimed that, "Hell, I've got a dam that'll hold a hundred of them."

Arrest

After being indicted by a federal grand jury in December 1964, Burrage was placed under arrest by the Federal Bureau of Investigation for violation of Title 18, Section 241, United States Code.

He was officially arrested at 8:27 a.m., December 4, 1964, and transported via Highway 16 out of Philadelphia, Mississippi east to DeKalb, Mississippi and south from DeKalb on Highway 39 to the Naval Auxiliary Air Station, Meridian, Mississippi where he was taken to the Bachelor Officers Quarters on the base where he was photographed and fingerprinted.

At trial, Burrage insisted that he knew nothing about the killings of the three civil rights workers found buried on his property and was acquitted in 1967.

Death

Burrage died on March 15, 2013, the day before his 83th birthday. The local newspaper, The Neshoba Democrat, did not mention Burrage's alleged involvement in the Freedom Summer Murders in his obituary.

See also

 Samuel Bowers
 Edgar Ray Killen
 Cecil Price
 Lawrence A. Rainey
 Alton Wayne Roberts
 Jimmy Snowden
 Herman Tucker
 Civil Rights Movement
United States v. Price

References

1930 births
2013 deaths
People from Philadelphia, Mississippi
Racially motivated violence against African Americans
Murder in Mississippi
Place of birth missing
Crimes in Mississippi